The women's water polo tournament at the 2012 Summer Olympics in London was held from 30 July to 9 August at the Water Polo Arena.

Teams from eight nations competed in the tournament and have been seeded into two groups for the preliminary round. A total of 24 games were played, 12 of them in the preliminary round.

Format

The tournament featured eight teams, separated into two groups of four teams. Each team played the other three teams in its pool once in a round-robin format. All eight teams advanced to the quarterfinal stage where they were seeded and played against a team from the other group.

The winners of the quarterfinal games moved on to the semifinals, while the quarterfinal losers played a series of classification games. The semifinal winners played in the gold medal game, while the losers played each other for the bronze.

Preliminary round
All times are BST (UTC+1).

Group A

Group B

Final round
Final bracket

5th place bracket

Quarterfinals
All times are BST (UTC+1).

5th–8th place classification
All times are BST (UTC+1).

Semifinals
All times are BST (UTC+1).

7th place match
All times are BST (UTC+1).

5th place match
All times are BST (UTC+1).

Bronze medal match
All times are BST (UTC+1).

Gold medal match
All times are BST (UTC+1).

Ranking and statistics

Final ranking

Multi-time Olympians

Four-time Olympian(s): 3 players
 : Sofia Konukh
 : Heather Petri, Brenda Villa

Three-time Olympian(s): 6 players
 : Kate Gynther, Melissa Rippon
 : Rita Drávucz
 : Tania Di Mario, Elena Gigli (GK), Anikó Pelle

Multiple medalists

Four-time Olympic medalist(s): 2 players
 : Heather Petri, Brenda Villa

Top goalscorers

Medallists

Awards
The women's all-star team was announced on 9 August 2012.

Most Valuable Player
  Maggie Steffens (21 goals)

Media All-Star Team
 Goalkeeper
  Elizabeth Armstrong (53 saves)
 Field players
  Barbara Bujka (centre forward, left-handed, 12 goals)
  Anni Espar (15 goals)
  Holly Lincoln-Smith (centre back, 5 goals)
  Jennifer Pareja (12 goals, 21 sprints won)
  Maggie Steffens (21 goals)
  Nicola Zagame (12 goals, 4 sprints won)

See also

 Water polo at the 2012 Summer Olympics – Men's tournament

References

Sources
 PDF documents on the FINA website:
 Official Results Book – 2012 Olympic Games – Diving, Swimming, Synchronised Swimming, Water Polo (archive) (pp. 284–507)
 Water polo on the Olympedia website
 Water polo at the 2012 Summer Olympics (women's tournament)
 Water polo on the Sports Reference website
 Water polo at the 2012 Summer Games (women's tournament) (archived)

Women's tournament
2012 in women's water polo
Women's water polo competitions
Women's water polo in the United Kingdom
Women's events at the 2012 Summer Olympics